Serendipity is a short-lived BBC TV series consisting of 10 episodes, which was broadcast from September to December 1973 at Sunday lunch times on BBC1, presented by actress Katy Manning, who had only recently left her role as Jo Grant in the TV series Doctor Who. It was Manning's first TV presenting role. The series presented a guide to getting started in arts and crafts. The Radio Times carried the tag line "Crafts are for everyone" for each episode listing. A book accompanying the series was published, retailing at 40 pence.

List of episodes

The first seven episodes of the series were later repeated on Monday afternoons on BBC1 from 1 April to 20 May 1974 at 2:35pm.

References

BBC Television shows
1973 British television series debuts
1973 British television series endings
British non-fiction television series